The chapters of Japanese shōjo manga series I Am Here! is written and illustrated by Ema Tōyama. The series was serialized in Kodansha's shōjo manga magazine Nakayoshi from July 2007 to January 2009. Kodansha released 19 chapters of manga in 5 tankōbon volumes under Kodansha Comics imprint. The first volume published on December 6, 2007 and fifth volume on March 19, 2009. The manga is licensed in English by Del Rey Manga. The first volume was published on November 23, 2010.



Volume list

References 

I Am Here!